Alexis Damianos (1921–2006) was a Greek, film/theatre and television director.

Biography
Damianos was born in Athens on January 21, 1921. He studied at the National Theatre of Greece and the philosophy department of the University of Athens.

He was the founder of "Experimental Theatre" and "Poreia Theatre", where he directed a lot of plays.

Damianos directed three feature films which contributed to the development of Greek cinema and the most famous of them is Evdokia (1971).

He died in Athens on May 4, 2006.

Filmography

 Cornerstone (Greek: ...μέχρι το πλοίο) (1967)
 Evdokia (Greek: Ευδοκία) (1971)
 The Charioteer (Greek: Ηνίοχος) (1995)

Bibliography
 Vrasidas Karalis, A history of greek cinema bibliography, New York: Continuum, 2012. 121. Print.

References

External links
 

1921 births
2006 deaths
Greek film directors
Greek theatre directors
Film people from Athens